The 2015 World Women's Curling Championship (branded as the Zen-Noh World Women's Curling Championship 2015 for sponsorship reasons) was held from March 14 to 22 at the Tsukisamu Gymnasium in Sapporo, Japan. It marks the second time that a world championship has been held in Japan, after the 2007 World Women's Curling Championship in Aomori.

Qualification
The following nations are qualified to participate in the 2015 World Women's Curling Championship:
 (host country)
Two teams from the Americas zone

 (given that no challenges in the Americas zone are issued)
Eight teams from the 2014 European Curling Championships

 (winner of the World Challenge Games)
One team from the 2014 Pacific-Asia Curling Championships

Teams

WCT ranking
World Curling Tour Order of Merit ranking of national teams (year to date total)

Round-robin standings
Final round-robin standings

Round-robin results
All draw times are listed in Japan Standard Time (UTC+9).

Draw 1
Saturday, March 14, 14:00

Draw 2
Saturday, March 14, 19:00

Draw 3
Sunday, March 15, 9:00

Draw 4
Sunday, March 15, 14:00

Draw 5
Sunday, March 15, 19:00

Draw 6
Monday, March 16, 9:00

Draw 7
Monday, March 16, 14:00

Draw 8
Monday, March 16, 19:00

Draw 9
Tuesday, March 17, 9:00

Draw 10
Tuesday, March 17, 14:00

Draw 11
Tuesday, March 17, 19:00

Draw 12
Wednesday, March 18, 9:00

Draw 13
Wednesday, March 18, 14:00

Draw 14
Wednesday, March 18, 19:00

Draw 15
Thursday, March 19, 9:00

Draw 16
Thursday, March 19, 14:00

Draw 17
Thursday, March 19, 19:00

Tiebreaker
Friday, March 20, 9:00

Playoffs

3 vs. 4
Friday, March 20, 19:00

1 vs. 2
Saturday, March 21, 9:00

Semifinal
Saturday, March 21, 17:00

Bronze medal game
Sunday, March 22, 9:00

Final
Sunday, March 22, 15:00

Statistics

Top 5 Player percentages
Final Round Robin Percentages

Perfect games

References
General

Specific

External links
 (web archive)

World Womens
World Womens Curling
Sports competitions in Sapporo
Women's sport in Japan
World Women's Curling Championship
International curling competitions hosted by Japan
March 2015 sports events in Japan
21st century in Sapporo
Women's curling competitions in Japan